This is a list of the districts of the London Borough of Havering in London, England.

Neighbourhoods
All these areas became part of the borough when it was created on 1 April 1965. It is indicated where a district formed an earlier independent unit of local administration. As the planning authorities, Havering London Borough Council classify seven locations as town centres. The Greater London Authority identifies Romford to be a metropolitan centre and the remaining town centres as district centres.

Wards and area committees

Within London, population figures are not collected for localities, instead they are enumerated for political wards.

References
Footnotes

Bibliography

 
Lists of places in London